II is the third album from the band Espers.  It was their first to be released on Drag City.  The song "Children of Stone" was later covered by Marianne Faithfull on her 2008 album Easy Come, Easy Go.

Track listing
"Dead Queen" – 8:13
"Widow's Weed" – 6:51
"Cruel Storm" – 5:17
"Children of Stone" – 8:54
"Mansfield and Cyclops" – 5:57
"Dead King" – 8:02
"Moon Occults the Sun" – 6:47

References

2006 albums
Espers (band) albums
Drag City (record label) albums